Au Revoir Taipei is a 2010 Taiwanese romantic comedy film set in Taipei and is Arvin Chen's feature directorial debut. It won the NETPAC Award at the 2010 Berlin International Film Festival and was considered a box office success in Taiwan.

Plot
Kai, a lovesick young man, wants to leave Taipei in hopes of getting to Paris to be with his girlfriend. Kai spends long nights in a bookstore studying French, where Susie, a girl who works there, begins to take an interest in him. After one extra ordinary night, Kai finds the excitement and romance he was longing for are already right there in Taipei.

Cast
 Yao Chun-yao as Kai
 Amber Kuo as Susie
 Lawrence Ko as Hong
 Joseph Chang as Jiyong
 Tseng Pei-yu as Yuan Yuan
 Tony Yang as Lei Meng
 Frankie Kao as Bao Ge
 Jack Kao as Kai's father
 Chiang Kang-Che as Gao gao

Awards
Au Revoir Taipei won the NETPAC Award at the Berlin International Film Festival 2010, the Jury Award at the Deauville Asian Film Festival in France, the Audience Award at the 2010 San Francisco Asian American International Film Festival, the Golden Durian (Best Film) Award at the 2010 Barcelona Asian Film Festival, and Best Narrative Feature at the Asian Film Festival of Dallas.

Kuo was awarded Best New Actor at the 12th Taipei Film Festival in 2010 for her role as Susie.

References

External links

Beta Cinema

2010 films
Films set in Taipei
Films shot in Taipei
Taiwanese-language films
Taiwanese romantic comedy films
2010s Mandarin-language films
2010 romantic comedy films